The 228th Aviation Regiment is an aviation regiment of the U.S. Army.

Structure

 2nd Battalion
 Company A using the Beechcraft C-12U Huron at Joint Base McGuire–Dix–Lakehurst

References

228